Patrick Neville was an Irish hurler. At club level he played for Dungarvan and was a substitute on the Waterford senior hurling team that won the 1948 All-Ireland Championship.

References

Dungarvan hurlers
Waterford inter-county hurlers
Year of birth missing
Possibly living people